OK is the fifth studio album by American mathcore band The Fall of Troy, released on April 20, 2016. The album was self-released for free on the band's website. It was the first release since their 2009 album, In the Unlikely Event, and the first since their reunion in 2013. In May of 2016, the band released OK#2, an alternative and more raw mix of OK, which was also released for free. Two further versions, OK#3.1 and OK#3.2, instrumental versions of both OK and OK#2, respectively, were released for free on their website.

Track-listing

Personnel
 Thomas Erak: Guitar, vocals, producer
 Tim Ward: Bass, vocals, producer
 Andrew Forsman: Drums, synth, producer
 Lara Hilgemann: Vocals
 Dr. Skankenstein: Synth
 Jake Carden: Synth
 Johnny Goss: Synth, producer, engineering (at Dandelion Gold)
 Charles Macak: Producer, mixing (at Electrowerks)
 Troy Glessner: Mastering (at SPECTRE)
 Wood Simmons: Design and layout

References

External links
Official site

2016 albums
The Fall of Troy albums